Tantalum nitride (TaN) is a chemical compound, a nitride of tantalum. There are multiple phases of compounds, stoichimetrically from Ta2N to Ta3N5, including TaN.

As a thin film TaN find use as a diffusion barrier and insulating layer between copper interconnects in the back end of line of computer chips. Tantalum nitrides are also used in thin film resistors.

Phase diagram
The tantalum - nitrogen system includes several states including a nitrogen solid solution in Tantalum, as well as several nitride phases, which can vary from expected stoichiometry due to lattice vacancies. Annealing of nitrogen rich "TaN" can result in conversion to a two phase mixture of TaN and Ta5N6.

Ta5N6 is thought to be the more thermally stable compound - though it decomposes in vacuum at 2500C to Ta2N. It was reported the decomposition in vacuum from Ta3N5 via Ta4N5, Ta5N6, ε-TaN, to Ta2N.

Preparation
TaN is often prepared as thin films. Methods of depositing the films include RF-magnetron-reactive sputtering, Direct current (DC) sputtering, Self-propagating high-temperature synthesis (SHS) via 'combustion' of Tantalum powder in Nitrogen, low‐pressure metalorganic chemical vapor deposition (LP‐MOCVD), ion beam assisted deposition (IBAD), and by electron beam evaporation of tantalum in concert with high energy nitrogen ions.

Depending on the relative amount of N2, the deposited film can vary from (fcc) TaN to (hexagonal) Ta2N as nitrogen decreases. A variety of other phases have also been reported from deposition including bcc and hexagonal TaN; hexagonal Ta5N6; tetragonal Ta4N5; orthorhombic Ta6N2.5, Ta4N, or Ta3N5. The electrical properties of TaN films vary from metallic conductor to insulator depending on the relative nitrogen ratio, with N rich films being more resistive.

Uses
It is sometimes used in integrated circuit manufacture to create a diffusion barrier or "glue" layers between copper, or other conductive metals. In the case of BEOL processing (at c. 20 nm), copper is first coated with tantalum, then with TaN using physical vapour deposition (PVD); this barrier coated copper is then coated with more copper by PVD, and infilled with electrolytically coated copper, before being mechanically processed (grind/polishing).

It also has application in thin film resistors. It has the advantage over nichrome resistors of forming a passivating oxide film which is resistant to moisture.

References

Nitrides
Tantalum compounds